Protein-arginine deiminase type-4, is a human protein which in humans is encoded by the PADI4 gene. The protein as an enzyme, specifically protein-arginine deiminase, a type of  hydrolase.

Molecular biology

The human gene is found on the short arm of Chromosome 1 near the telomere (1p36.13). It is located on the Watson (plus) strand and is 55,806 bases long. The protein is 663 amino acids long with a molecular weight of 74,095 Da.

Function 

This gene is a member of a gene family which encodes enzymes responsible for the conversion of arginine to citrulline residues (citrullination). This gene may play a role in granulocyte and macrophage development leading to inflammation and immune response. PADI4 plays a role in the epigenetics, the deimination of arginines on histones H3 and H4 can act antagonistically to arginine methylation.

The protein may be found in oligomers and binds 5 calcium ions per subunit. It catalyses the reaction:

 Protein L-arginine + H2O = protein L-citrulline + NH3

Subcellular and tissue distribution 

It is normally found in the cytoplasm, nucleus and in cytoplasmic granules of eosinophils and neutrophils. It is not expressed in peripheral monocytes or lymphocytes. It is also expressed in rheumatoid arthritis synovial tissues.

References

Further reading